Fairfield Institute of Management and Technology and School of Law is a semi-private college, affiliated with Guru Gobind Singh Indraprastha University (GGSIPU).

History 
Fairfield Institute of Management and Technology (FIMT) was established by the Fairfield Group of Institutions in the year 2008.

Affiliation 
The institute is affiliated to Guru Gobind Singh Indraprastha University for all the offered programmes and is Govt. of NCT Delhi approved as well as it is accredited by Department of Higher Education (DHE) and ISO 14001:2004 and 9001:2008 certified.

Programmes 
 Bachelor of Arts (English)
 Bachelor of Business Administration integrated with LL.B.
 Bachelor of Arts integrated with LL.B.
 Bachelor of Computer Application
 Bachelor of Journalism
 Bachelor of Business Administration
 Bachelor of Commerce
 Bachelor of Arts (Economics)
 Bachelor of Education

References

Colleges of the Guru Gobind Singh Indraprastha University
2008 establishments in Delhi